We All Love Ennio Morricone is a 2007 tribute album honoring noted film composer Ennio Morricone. It features a diverse lineup of artists including Andrea Bocelli, Metallica, Bruce Springsteen, Roger Waters, and Celine Dion.  Also, industry giant Quincy Jones, an admirer of Morricone’s work as a composer for many years, enlisted his longtime songwriting collaborators Alan and Marilyn Bergman to write the lyrics to "I Knew I Loved You", which Dion sang to Morricone’s "Deborah's Theme" from Once Upon a Time in America. Bruce Springsteen won the Grammy Award Best Rock Instrumental Performance for his version of "Once Upon A Time In The West", beating out Metallica who was nominated for their cover of "The Ecstasy of Gold", also from this album. The album sold over 120,000 copies in Italy alone

Track listing
"I Knew I Loved You" - Celine Dion
"The Good, The Bad and The Ugly" -  Quincy Jones featuring Herbie Hancock
"Once Upon a Time in the West" - Bruce Springsteen
"Conradiana" - Andrea Bocelli
"The Ecstasy of Gold" - Metallica
"Maléna" - Yo-Yo Ma
"Come Sail Away" - Renée Fleming
"Gabriel's Oboe" - Ennio Morricone
"Conmigo" - Daniela Mercury featuring Eumir Deodato
"La Luz Prodigiosa" - Dulce Pontes
"Love Affair" - Chris Botti
"Je Changerais d'Avis" - Vanessa and the O's
"Lost Boys Calling" - Roger Waters
"The Tropical Variation" - Ennio Morricone
"Could Heaven Be" - Denyce Graves
"Addio Monti" - Taro Hakase
"Cinema Paradiso" - Ennio Morricone

Personnel

Metallica (track 5) 
 James Hetfield - lead guitar, vocals
 Kirk Hammett - rhythm guitar
 Lars Ulrich - drums
 Robert Trujillo - bass

References 

Tribute albums
2007 compilation albums
Ennio Morricone albums